Luís Filipe Duarte Ferreira da Silva, popularly known as Filipe Duarte (5 June 1973 – 17 April 2020), was an Angolan-born Portuguese actor and voice artist. He is best known for the roles in the films Variações: Guardian Angel, Cinzento e Negro and Noise.

Personal life 
He was born on 5 June 1973 in Nova Lisboa, then in the Portuguese overseas territory of Angola. He was married to a Spanish actress, Nuria Mencía. The couple has one daughter, Antonia who was born in March 2011. Duarte died on 17 April 2020, during the first COVID-19 lockdown in Portugal, at the age of 46 due to an acute myocardial infarction.

Career 
Duarte completed a drama course on theater at the Lisbon Theatre and Film School. Then he completed the actor training course at the Institute for Research and Theatrical Creation. He started his acting career with several stage plays under the renowned theater directors Adolfo Gutkin, Rogério de Carvalho, Geraldo Touché, Francisco Salgado, Carlos J. Pessoa, Laila Ripol and Miguel Seabra.

On the television screen, he acted in the telefilm Teorema de Pitágoras, directed by Gonçalo Galvão Telles. Then he joined the two TV serials A Ferreirinha, directed by Jorge Paixão da Costa and João Semana, by João Cayatte. When he became a popular actor with the serials, he played the leading role in the series Ecuador which was based on the novel by Miguel Sousa Tavares. In 2013, he played the popular role 'João Belmonte' in the television soapie Belmonte.

Meanwhile, Filipe made regular voice-overs for cartoons and animated films including the famous character 'Sanosuke Sagara' in the animated series Samurai X.

At the time of his death in 2020, he was recording the Brazilian soap opera Amor de Mãe, showing on SIC, joined the cast of the film Nothing Ever Happened directed by Gonçalo Galvão Teles.

Filmography

References

External links 
 

1973 births
2020 deaths
Portuguese male film actors
Angolan male actors
Portuguese male television actors
Portuguese male voice actors